Symplocos buxifolia is a plant in the family Symplocaceae, native to Borneo. The specific epithet buxifolia refers to the leaves' resemblance to those of species in the genus Buxus.

Description
The straight twigs become cracked with age. The inflorescences, sometimes featuring racemes, bear white to yellow flowers.

Distribution and habitat
Symplocos buxifolia is endemic to Borneo, where it is known only from Mount Kinabalu in Sabah.

References

buxifolia
Endemic flora of Borneo
Flora of Mount Kinabalu
Plants described in 1894
Taxa named by Otto Stapf